Grevillea armigera, also known as prickly toothbrushes or thorny grevillea, is a species of flowering plant in the family Proteaceae and is endemic to the south-west of Western Australia. It is an erect to spreading shrub with deeply-lobed leaves, the lobes linear and sharply pointed, and grey, green or pale yellow flowers with black to maroon styles.

Description

Taxonomy
Grevillea armigera was first formally described in 1856 by Swiss botanist Carl Meissner in de Candolle's Prodromus Systematis Naturalis Regni Vegetabilis from specimens collected by James Drummond in the Swan River Colony. The specific epithet (armigera) means "furnished with thorns".

Distribution and habitat
Prickly toothbrushes grows in heath and shrubland from Buntine to near Dowerin in the Avon Wheatbelt and Geraldton Sandplains biogeographic regions.

References

armigera
Endemic flora of Western Australia
Eudicots of Western Australia
Proteales of Australia
Taxa named by Carl Meissner
Plants described in 1856